Mediterranean Revival is an architectural style introduced in the United States, Canada, and certain other countries in the 19th century. It incorporated references from Spanish Renaissance, Spanish Colonial, Italian Renaissance, French Colonial, Beaux-Arts, Moorish architecture, and Venetian Gothic architecture.

Peaking in popularity during the 1920s and 1930s, the movement drew heavily on the style of palaces and seaside villas and applied them to the rapidly expanding coastal resorts of Florida and California.

Structures are typically based on a rectangular floor plan, and feature massive, symmetrical primary façades. Stuccoed walls, red tiled roofs, windows in the shape of arches or circles, one or two stories, wood or wrought iron balconies with window grilles, and articulated door surrounds are characteristic. Keystones were occasionally employed. Ornamentation may be simple or dramatic. Lush gardens often appear.

The style was most commonly applied to hotels, apartment buildings, commercial structures, and residences.  Architects August Geiger and Addison Mizner were foremost in Florida, while Bertram Goodhue, Sumner Spaulding, and Paul Williams were in California. 

There are also examples of this architectural style in Cuba, such as the Hotel Nacional de Cuba, in Havana.

Examples

 E. W. Marland Mansion in Ponca City, Oklahoma, completed in 1928
 Hayes Mansion in San Jose, California, completed in 1905
 Rose Crest Mansion (Currently a portion of The Mary Louis Academy) in Jamaica Estates, New York, completed in 1909
 Delaware and Hudson Passenger Station in Lake George, New York, 1909–1911
 Natural History Museum of Los Angeles County in Los Angeles, California, 1913
 Villa Vizcaya in Miami, Florida, completed in 1914
 Presidio building in San Francisco, California, completed in 1912
 The Ambassador Hotel in Los Angeles, California, 1921 (demolished)
 Allouez Pump House in Allouez, Wisconsin, 1925
 Freedom Tower in Miami, Florida, completed in 1925
 The Twilight Zone Tower of Terror in Walt Disney World, Orlando, Florida. 1994
 Vinoy Park Hotel in St. Petersburg, Florida, completed in 1925
 Snell Arcade in St. Petersburg, Florida.  1925
 Boca Raton Resort & Club in Boca Raton, Florida, completed in 1926
 Miami-Biltmore Hotel in Coral Gables, Florida, completed in 1926
 Fort Harrison Hotel in Clearwater, Florida, completed in 1926
 Cà d'Zan, former John Ringling estate in Sarasota, Florida, completed in 1926
 Francis Marion Stokes Fourplex in Portland, Oregon, completed in 1926
 Florida Theatre in Jacksonville, Florida, completed in 1927
 Pasadena City Hall in Pasadena, California, 1927
 Gaia Apartment Building in Berkeley, California, 2001
 Nottingham Cooperative, 1927, Madison, Wisconsin
 Greenacres (Former Harold Lloyd Estate) in Beverly Hills, California, completed in 1928
 Don CeSar Hotel, St. Pete Beach, Florida, completed in 1928
 Beverly Shores Railroad Station, 1928
 Catalina Casino in Avalon, California, completed May 29, 1929
 Port Washington Fire Engine House in Wisconsin, completed in 1929
 Casa Casuarina (Versace Mansion, now known as The Villa By Barton G.) in Miami Beach, Florida, 1930
 Santa Fe Railway depot in Fullerton, California, completed 1930
 Town Club (Portland, Oregon), completed 1931
 Beverly Hills City Hall, Beverly Hills, California, 1932
 Cooley High School, Detroit, Michigan, built in 1928
 Sunrise Theatre, Fort Pierce, Florida, built in 1922
 The Church of Scientology's Flag Building, Clearwater, Florida, completed in 2011
 Plymouth County Hospital, a tuberculosis sanatorium in Hanson, Massachusetts. Completed in 1919
 The Wolfsonian-FIU, in Miami Beach, Florida, 1927
 The L. Ron Hubbard House, Washington, D.C., built in 1904

See also

 Italianate architecture
 Gothicmed – project which includes finding further insight to Gothic architecture in the Mediterranean area
 Mission Revival Style architecture
 Spanish Colonial Revival architecture
 Mar del Plata style, eclectic vernacular style which borrows some of the references incorporated by the Mediterranean Revival
 Moorish Revival architecture

References

Sources
 
 
 
 Nolan, David.  The Houses of St. Augustine. Sarasota, Pineapple Press, 1995.
 

 
American architectural styles
Revival architectural styles
Addison Mizner